If I Could is an EP released by 24-7 Spyz in 1997. It features album cuts from their 1996 full-length release Heavy Metal Soul by the Pound as well as several live tracks recorded in early 1996 with Joel Maitoza on drums. 

Like many 24-7 Spyz albums, the recording is out of print.

Track listing
"If I Could" (remix)
"If I Could"
"Along Comes Mary"
"New Super Hero Worship" (live)
"Room #9" (live)
"Love & Peace" (live)
"Tick, Tick, Tick" (live)
"Stuntman" (live)

Personnel
Jimi Hazel: guitar, vocals
Rick Skatore: bass, vocals
Joel Maitoza: drums

1997 EPs
24-7 Spyz albums
Live EPs
1997 live albums